Crassispira sundaica is a species of sea snail, a marine gastropod mollusk in the family Pseudomelatomidae.

Description

Distribution
This marine species occurs off  western Sumatra, Indonesia

References

 Thiele, J., 1925. Gastropoden der Deutschen Tiefsee-Expedition. In:. Wissenschaftliche Ergebnisse der Deutschen Tiefsee-Expedition II. Teil, 17(2), Gutstav Fischer, Berlin.

External links
 

sundaica
Gastropods described in 1925